Youssef Gaddour (born 15 March 1990, Monastir) is a Tunisian professional basketball player. He plays for Tunisia national basketball team. He competed at the 2012 Summer Olympics.

References

External links
 Afrobasket profile

1990 births
Living people
Tunisian men's basketball players
Olympic basketball players of Tunisia
Basketball players at the 2012 Summer Olympics
Mediterranean Games bronze medalists for Tunisia
Mediterranean Games medalists in basketball
Competitors at the 2013 Mediterranean Games
Tunisian expatriate basketball people in Morocco

People from Monastir Governorate
20th-century Tunisian people
21st-century Tunisian people